Natasha Khristova (born 19 November 1969) is a Bulgarian swimmer. She competed in two events at the 1988 Summer Olympics.

References

1969 births
Living people
Bulgarian female swimmers
Olympic swimmers of Bulgaria
Swimmers at the 1988 Summer Olympics
Place of birth missing (living people)
20th-century Bulgarian women
21st-century Bulgarian women